Sonshine Sports Management, Inc. (SSMI) is a Philippine-based sports management company based in Davao City, Philippines. It was founded in June 2014 by the Executive Pastor of the Kingdom of Jesus Christ, Pastor Apollo Quiboloy who is named as the company's honorable chairman. Former North Cotabato Vice Governor Manny Piñol also helped Quiboloy in forming of the new sporting management group. SSM organized different sporting events in the Davao region (and possibly expanding into the Philippines in the few coming years) including the boxing series called "Boxing Revolution" featuring amateur and professional boxing superstars and the ACQ Cup Basketball League, featuring different collegiate and high school men's basketball teams from the Mindanao region. Golf and volleyball tournaments will soon follow.

SSMI events will also soon to be held in the KJC King Dome, Mindanao's largest indoor arena set to be completed in 2017.

References

External links
Official website

2014 establishments in the Philippines
Boxing promoters
Sports in Davao del Sur
Companies based in Davao City